El Valle is a stratovolcano in central Panama and is the easternmost volcano along the Central American Volcanic Arc which has been formed by the subduction of the Nazca Plate below Central America.  Some time prior to 200,000 years ago, the volcano underwent a huge eruption event that caused the top of the volcano to collapse into the empty magma chamber below forming a large caldera.  Several lava domes have developed inside the caldera since the collapse—forming Cerro Pajita, Cerro Gaital and Cerro Caracoral peaks.  Prior to research in the early 1990s, it was thought that no active volcanism existed within Panama.  But radioactive dates from El Valle show that the volcano last erupted as recently as 200,000 years ago.

Work by de Boer et al. and Defant et al. of other volcanoes within Panama have shown that there are two episodes of volcanism—young (< 2.5 million years ago) and old (> 4.5 million years ago) groups.  The young volcanism consists of adakites (slab melts) whereas the older volcanism appears to be normal calc-alkaline volcanism.

See also
List of volcanoes in Panama
El Valle de Antón, a nearby town
 APROVACA

References

External links 
 Website of El Valle de Anton

Calderas of North America
Mountains of Panama
Pleistocene calderas
Pleistocene stratovolcanoes
Stratovolcanoes of Panama